Karin Kschwendt and Natalia Medvedeva were the defending champions, but none competed this year.

Ruxandra Dragomir and Laura Garrone won the title by defeating qualifiers Alice Canepa and Giulia Casoni 6–1, 6–0 in the final.

Seeds

Draw

Draw

References

 Official results archive (ITF)
 Official results archive (WTA)

Torneo Internazional Femmin di Palermo - Doubles
1994 Doubles